Ardozyga nephelota is a species of moth in the family Gelechiidae. It was described by Edward Meyrick in 1904. It is found in Australia, where it has been recorded from New South Wales and Victoria.

The forewings are light fuscous irrorated (speckled) with dark fuscous. The stigmata are moderate, dark fuscous, with the plical rather beyond the first discal and a similar dot immediately beneath the second discal. There is a row of obscure pale dots along the posterior half of the costa and termen. The hindwings are grey.

References

Ardozyga
Moths described in 1904
Taxa named by Edward Meyrick
Moths of Australia